NGC 132 is a spiral galaxy in the constellation Cetus. It was discovered by William Herschel. The type Ic supernova SN 2004fe was discovered in this galaxy on October 30, 2004.

Appearance 
Herschel described the spiral galaxy as, "pretty faint, considerably large, round, very gradually little brighter middle, mottled but not resolved." On October 12, 1827, John Herschel observed it again.

References

External links
 

Intermediate spiral galaxies
0132
01844
Cetus (constellation)
00301